Heacham River is a small river in the King's Lynn and West Norfolk district of the English County of Norfolk. Its source is near the village of Bircham Newton , 25 metres above sea level.

Course
From its source at a pond near Bircham Newton the river flows towards Fring where it is crossed by Peddars Way and then runs across open countryside in a north westerly direction. Over the years this part of the river has been heavily modified but without any significant flood defence. After 2 miles the river runs through a shallow wooded valley south of the village of Sedgeford. From Sedgeford the river slowly curves north west towards Heacham crossing under the B1454 road and then turns west towards the only mill on the river. Just past the road bridge the river divides into two: one branch which once fed the millpond for the mill, and the other running past the mill.

Heacham Watermill

Heacham watermill or Caley Mill, as it is also known, looks very different from most other mills in Norfolk, being Gothic revival in architectural style and built of local carrstone. It was also unique in Norfolk for having its waterwheel on the outside of the building. Originally used to grind corn, the building is now owned and has been used by Norfolk Lavender for lavender production since 1932. After the mill the river passes under the A149 coast road and then skirts around the northern side of the village of Heacham. The river then flows through Heacham Park where a channel from it feeds a small lake. After the lake the river goes north for a couple of hundred feet before turning west again crossing low-level meadows. The river ends up against the tidal flaps at South Beach between Snettisham and Heacham, where it fills a series of pools that run parallel to the coast. These pools discharge at low tide. The river supports a varied and diverse wildlife population including the water vole. There is also a small breeding trout population in the upper reaches, while in the lower reaches eels can be found.

See also
List of rivers of England

References

External links
 
 Heacham – Community website
 Heacham Online
 William White's History, Gazetteer, and Directory of Norfolk 1845
 1891 Census of Heacham
 Norfolk Lavender

Heacham, River